The 1946 Kent State Golden Flashes football team was an American football team that represented Kent State University in the Ohio Athletic Conference (OAC) during the 1946 college football season. In its first season under head coach Trevor J. Rees, Kent State compiled a 6–2 record.

Kent State ranked fourth nationally among small-college teams with an average of 349.1 yards per game in total offense. It also ranked fourth nationally in total defense, giving up an average of only 115.1 yards per game.

Schedule

References

Kent State
Kent State Golden Flashes football seasons
Kent State Golden Flashes football